William M. Whipple was an Arizona politician who served a single term in the Arizona State House of Representatives during the 1st Arizona State Legislature.

He moved to Arizona in 1876.  His son, W. D. Whipple, also served in the Arizona State Legislature, as a state senator representing Greenlee County during the 3rd Arizona State Legislature.  Whipple died on August 31, 1918.

References

Democratic Party members of the Arizona House of Representatives